Kalavu is a 2019 Indian Tamil-language crime thriller film written and directed by Murali Karthick. The film stars Kalaiyarasan and Karunakaran, with Vatsan Chakravarthy and Abhirami Iyer in a supporting roles. The film has music composed by Sundaramurthy. The film was released on ZEE5 on 9 February 2019.

Plot

Cast 

Kalaiyarasan as Sujeeth
Karunakaran as Gautham
Venkat Prabhu as Inspector
Vatsan Chakravarthy as Stephen
Abhirami Iyer as Shruthi
Chinni Jayanth as watchman
Chetan as Sujeeth's father
Geevee as Ashok
Gautham Harikrishnan
Aravind Murali as Maari

Production 
Debutant director Murali Karthick created a 37-minute pilot film to show producers before getting an opportunity to make the film. Kalaiyarasan, Karunakaran and Venkat Prabhu were selected to play the lead roles, while model Abhirami Iyer was signed to play a lead actress.

Reception 
The film was released as a ZEE5 original on 9 February 2019. The Indian Express wrote "The writing is intelligent and so is the screenplay. With the scenes and its match cuts, director Murali Karthick firmly positions himself as an unreliable narrator, keeping you hooked".

References

External links 

 

2010s Tamil-language films
2019 crime thriller films
2019 direct-to-video films
2019 directorial debut films
2019 films
Hyperlink films
Indian crime thriller films
ZEE5 original films